Return to Pooh Corner is the eighth studio and first children's album by American singer-songwriter Kenny Loggins. The title is a reference to A.A. Milne's 1928 book The House at Pooh Corner. Released in 1994, it features songs written by John Lennon, Rickie Lee Jones, Paul Simon and Jimmy Webb, along with several other traditional children's songs. The songs are described as "music for parents and children to enjoy together". It was a successful album for Loggins, selling over 500,000 copies, and was nominated for a Grammy Award for Best Musical Album for Children. Guest appearances are made by David Crosby and Graham Nash on "All the Pretty Little Ponies", Patti Austin on the "Neverland Medley" and Amy Grant and Gary Chapman on the title track (a rewritten version of "House at Pooh Corner", a song Loggins wrote in high school and had previously recorded with Jim Messina for their 1971 album Sittin' In). Loggins returned to Pooh Corner several years later with 2000's More Songs from Pooh Corner.

Track listing
"All the Pretty Little Ponies" (Featuring David Crosby and Graham Nash) (Trad. arr: Loggins, David Pack) – 3:59
"Neverland Medley" (With Patti Austin, introduction by Gene Wilder "Reprising" his role of Willy Wonka) – 7:08
"Pure Imagination" (Leslie Bricusse, Anthony Newley)
"Somewhere Out There" (Cynthia Weil, James Horner, Barry Mann)
"Never Never Land" (Comden and Green, Styne)
"Return to Pooh Corner" (Loggins, new verse written for his third son) – 4:14
"Rainbow Connection" (From The Muppet Movie) (Paul Williams, Kenneth Ascher) – 3:46
"St. Judy's Comet" (Paul Simon) – 5:08
"The Last Unicorn" (Jimmy Webb) – 3:27
"Cody's Song" (Loggins, new version of song from previous Leap of Faith album) – 4:36
"The Horses" (Rickie Lee Jones, Walter Becker) – 5:19
"Love" (John Lennon) – 5:05
"To-Ra-Loo-Ra" (Trad. arr: Loggins, L. Grean) – 4:44

Personnel
 Kenny Loggins – vocals, electric guitar (3), acoustic guitar (7), backing vocals (5, 7, 8, 9)

Additional musicians
 Chet Atkins – mandocello (5)
 Patti Austin - vocals (2)
 David Benoit – keyboards (2), acoustic piano (9)
 Gary Chapman - backing vocals
 David Crosby - backing vocals
 Nathan East – bass guitar (1, 3, 8)
 Steve George – backing vocals (3, 5, 7), synthesizer (5, 9), keyboards (7)
 Amy Grant - backing vocals
 Lorin Grean – recorders (1, 10), celtic harp (10)
 Howard Levy – harmonica (7), ocarina (9)
 Brian Mann – accordion (1, 3, 4, 7), synthesizer (5)
 Terry McMillan – harmonica (4, 8), percussion (8)
 Graham Nash - backing vocals (1)
 David Pack – synthesizers, guitar, backing vocals (8)
 Dean Parks – guitar (1–2, 5, 8)
 Greg Phillinganes – synthesizer (4, 8), synthetic banjo(4), piano (6)
 Kate Price – backing vocals (2)
 Kevin Ricard – percussion (8)
 Ed Rockett – tin whistle (1)
 Chris Rodriguez – guitar (3)
 Guy Thomas – guitar (7)
 Steve Wood – keyboards (1, 3–4), synthesizer (2, 6), bass guitar (2)

Recording personnel
 Kenny Loggins – producer, arranger (1-4, 10)
 Terry Nelson – producer
 David Pack – producer (1-4, 6, 8), arranger (1-4)
 David Benoit – arranger (2)
 Lorin Grean – arrangements (10)
 Terry Nelson – recording engineer, mixing engineer
 Juan Garza – assistant engineer
Dave Squatty Barrera - Keyboard Programming 
 Anders Johannson – assistant engineer
 Kevin Simonett – assistant engineer
 Manny Marroquin – mixing assistant
 Joe Gastwirt – mastering engineer

References

1994 albums
Kenny Loggins albums
Columbia Records albums
Children's music albums by American artists